Orengo is a surname that may refer to:

Christine Orengo, professor of bioinformatics
Gilbert Orengo (born 1934), Monegasque fencer
James Orengo, Kenyan politician
Joe Orengo (1914–1988), American infielder in Major League Baseball
José Orengo (born 1976), Argentine rugby union footballer and coach.
Nico Orengo (1944–2009), Italian poet and journalist.